Ulysses Grant Thatcher (February 23, 1877 – March 17, 1936) was an American right-handed pitcher in Major League Baseball. Born in Maytown, Pennsylvania, he pitched in five games for the Brooklyn Superbas during the 1903 and 1904 baseball seasons, making four starts, and acquiring a 4–1 record with a 3.16 earned run average during his appearances. He died at age 59 in Lancaster, Pennsylvania.

Thatcher had an unusual end to his Major League career. When the Superbas attempted to play a second Sunday home game on April 24 against the Philadelphia Phillies, the club was tipped off that the pitcher, catcher and hitter at the start of the game would be arrested. Thus three "decoys" were inserted at the start of the game, with Ed Poole being replaced by Thatcher after Poole's arrest.

References

External links

1877 births
1936 deaths
Major League Baseball pitchers
Brooklyn Superbas players
Baseball players from Pennsylvania
People from Lancaster County, Pennsylvania
Lancaster Maroons players
Johnstown Mormans players
Palmyra Mormans players
Brockton Shoemakers players
Reading Coal Heavers players
Bristol Bell Makers players
Troy Washerwomen players
Ilion Typewriters players
Los Angeles (minor league baseball) players
Savannah Pathfinders players
Johnstown Johnnies players